Patamedi Ronald Moroatshehla is a South African politician who serves as a Member of Parliament (MP) for the African National Congress. He was elected to parliament in 2019.

In the National Assembly of South Africa, Moroatshehla is a member of the Portfolio Committee on Basic Education and the Ad Hoc Committee to initiate and Introduce Legislation amending Section 25 of the Constitution.

References

External links

Living people
Year of birth missing (living people)
Place of birth missing (living people)
People from Limpopo
African National Congress politicians
Members of the National Assembly of South Africa